Buena Vista High School is a public secondary school in Buena Vista, Colorado, United States. It is one of two high schools in the Buena Vista School District.

Notable alumni
 Mason Finley, current holder of the national high school discus record, 2017 world championships bronze medalist
 Matt Hemingway, 2004 Olympic medalist in high jump
 Nate Solder, football player; 2011 first round pick, New England Patriots

References

External links
 

Public high schools in Colorado
Schools in Chaffee County, Colorado